Chiara Colizzi (born 29 May 1968) is an Italian voice actress.

Biography
Colizzi is well known throughout her career as a voice dubber. She is the official Italian voice of Nicole Kidman and Kate Winslet. She has also dubbed Emily Watson, Uma Thurman and Penélope Cruz in a majority of their work. On television, Colizzi provided the Italian voice of Elliot Reid (portrayed by Sarah Chalke) in Scrubs and she also dubbed Sarah Wayne Callies in Prison Break and The Walking Dead.

In Colizzi's animated roles, she voiced Gloria in the Italian dub of the Madagascar sequels as well as Princess Atta in the Italian dub of A Bug's Life.

Personal life
Colizzi is the daughter of voice actors Pino Colizzi and Manuela Andrei. She also has one son.

Dubbing roles

Live Action

 Kate Winslet in Titanic, Quills, The Life of David Gale, Eternal Sunshine of the Spotless Mind, Extras, Romance & Cigarettes, All the King's Men, Little Children, Revolutionary Road, The Reader, Mildred Pierce, Carnage, Contagion, Divergent, Movie 43, Labor Day, The Divergent Series: Insurgent, A Little Chaos, Steve Jobs, The Dressmaker, Triple 9,  Bear Grylls: Face the Wild, Collateral Beauty, The Mountain Between Us, Wonder Wheel
 Nicole Kidman in The Others, Birthday Girl, The Hours, Dogville, The Human Stain, Cold Mountain, The Stepford Wives, Birth, The Interpreter, Fur, The Invasion, The Golden Compass, Rabbit Hole, Just Go with It, Trespas, Grace of Monaco, The Railway Man, Paddington, Secret in Their Eyes Strangeland, The Family Fang, Genius, Lion, The Beguiled, The Killing of a Sacred Deer, Aquaman, Boy Erased, Bombshell, Big Little Lies
 Emily Watson in Metroland, Gosford Park, Red Dragon, Cradle Will Rock, Breaking the Waves, The Boxer, Angela's Ashes, The Life and Death of Peter Sellers, Miss Potter, The Water Horse: Legend of the Deep, Fireflies in the Garden, Synecdoche, New York, War Horse, Anna Karenina, The Book Thief, Belle, A Royal Night Out, Kingsman: The Golden Circle, The Happy Prince, On Chesil Beach , Chernobyl, The Third Day
 Penélope Cruz in The Girl of Your Dreams, Captain Corelli's Mandolin, Vanilla Sky, Noel, Sahara, Vicky Cristina Barcelona, Pirates of the Caribbean: On Stranger Tides, Venuto al mondo, The Counselor, Ma Ma, Zoolander 2, Grimsby, Murder on the Orient Express, Loving Pablo, Everybody Knows, Wasp Network
 Jessica Chastain in Coriolanus, Lawless, Agatha Christie's Poirot, The Debt, Zero Dark Thirty, Mama, Interstellar, The Disappearance of Eleanor Rigby, A Most Violent Year, The Huntsman: Winter's War, Miss Sloane, Molly's Game
Uma Thurman in Kill Bill: Volume 1, Kill Bill: Volume 2, Be Cool, Hysterical Blindness, Prime, The Producers, My Super Ex-Girlfriend, Percy Jackson & the Olympians: The Lightning Thief, The Accidental Husband, Bel Ami, Playing for Keeps, Nymphomaniac
Michelle Williams in Land of Plenty, Shutter Island, My Week with Marilyn, Oz the Great and Powerful, Suite Française, All the Money in the World, I Feel Pretty, After the Wedding
Radha Mitchell in Phone Booth, Man on Fire, Melinda and Melinda, Mozart and the Whale, Thick as Thieves, The Crazies, Olympus Has Fallen, London Has Fallen

Animation
Gloria in Madagascar: Escape 2 Africa
Gloria in Madagascar 3: Europe's Most Wanted
Princess Atta in A Bug's Life
Trudy in Bee Movie
Susan Frankenstein in Frankenweenie
Cappy in Robots
Anita Radcliffe in 101 Dalmatians II: Patch's London Adventure
Marlene in Free Willy
Spy Fly in ChalkZone

Live action
Elliot Reid in Scrubs
Grace Stewart in The Others
Nadia in Birthday Girl
Virginia Woolf in The Hours
Rose DeWitt Bukater in Titanic
Madeleine "Maddy" LeClerc in Quills
Bitsey Bloom in The Life of David Gale
Grace Margaret Mulligan in Dogville
Faunia Farley in The Human Stain
Ada Monroe in Cold Mountain
Clementine Kruczynski in Eternal Sunshine of the Spotless Mind
Tula in Romance & Cigarettes
Anne Stanton in All the King's Men
Joanna Eberhart in The Stepford Wives
Anna in Birth
Silvia Broome in The Interpreter
April Wheeler in Revolutionary Road
Hanna Schmitz in The Reader
Nancy Cowan in Carnage
Diane Arbus in Fur
Carol Bennell in The Invasion
Marisa Coulter in The Golden Compass
Erin Mears in Contagion
Jeanine Matthews in Divergent
Jeanine Matthews in The Divergent Series: Insurgent
Margot in Margot at the Wedding
Claudia Jenssen in Nine
Becca Corbett in Rabbit Hole
The Bride in Kill Bill: Volume 1
The Bride in Kill Bill: Volume 2
Marion in Metroland
Anne MacMorrow in The Water Horse: Legend of the Deep
Sofia Serrano in Vanilla Sky
Valentina Valencia in Zoolander 2
Rhonda George in Grimsby
Sara Tancredi in Prison Break
Lori Grimes in The Walking Dead

References

External links
 
 
 

1968 births
Living people
Actresses from Rome
Italian voice actresses
Italian voice directors
20th-century Italian actresses
21st-century Italian actresses